Riverside, New Mexico may refer to:

 Riverside, Eddy County, New Mexico, an unincorporated community on the Pecos River
 Riverside, Grant County, New Mexico, an unincorporated community on the Gila River
 Riverside, Lincoln County, New Mexico, an unincorporated community on the Rio Hondo
 Riverside, Rio Arriba County, New Mexico, a former village on the Rio Grande
 Riverside, San Juan County, New Mexico, an unincorporated community on the Animas River